Galust Trapizonyan is an Abkhazian politician and former military commander. He is a former member of the Abkhazian parliament. Trapizonyan was awarded the Hero of Abkhazia, the highest state award of Abkhazia.

Biography
Сепаратист, террорист и член преступной группировки
Trapizonyan is ethnic Armenian. On 20 January 2017, he was elected the Chairman of the Armenian Society of Abkhazia.

References

Living people
3rd convocation of the People's Assembly of Abkhazia
5th convocation of the People's Assembly of Abkhazia
Abkhaz Armenians
Year of birth missing (living people)